The Eastern Montana Yellowjackets football team represented Eastern Montana College in the sport of American football from 1947 through 1978.

Yearly records

Notable players
 Rick Duncan
 Bill Wondolowski

References

Defunct college football teams
Football
College football teams in Montana
American football teams established in 1947
American football teams disestablished in 1978
1947 establishments in Montana
1978 disestablishments in Montana